Zinda Laash is a 1967 Pakistani Urdu horror film, directed by Khwaja Sarfraz. Produced by Abdul Baqi, it stars Asad Bukhari (Dr. Aqil Harker), Habib (Aqil's Brother), Deeba (Shabnam), Rehan (Vampire), Zareen Panna (Dancer) and Nasreen (Vampire bride). It was the first horror film of Pakistan, and also the first to be X-rated.

Zinda Laash is also known as Dracula in Pakistan (USA title) and The Living Corpse (International title).

Plot synopsis
Professor Tabini is experimenting on an elixir that he believes will beat death. When he tries it on himself, however, things don’t work out as planned and he dies. When his assistant finds him no longer among the living, she carries him downstairs and slaps him into the crypt in the basement. Unfortunately for her, he rises from the grave and chomps down on her neck.

Cast 

 Asad Bukhari as Dr. Aqil Harker
 Habib as Aqil's brother
 Deeba as Shabnam
 Rehan as the Vampire
 Zareen Panna as the Dancer
 Nasreen as the Vampire bride

Inspirations
The plot borrows heavily from Hammer Horror's Horror of Dracula, in fact there are times when the music even has a noticeable similarity to James Bernard's score. There are some classical themes thrown in as well. "The Barber of Seville" is playing during the car chase scene and some other cues which are  eccentric to say the least. Some elements of the plot even come directly from Bram Stoker's novel, not from "Horror of Dracula".
Zinda Laash is also referenced in Omar Khan's Zibahkhana, usually termed as its sequel.

Initial release and reception
Zinda Laash was released on 7 July 1967. The film couldn't do great at the box-office and was a flop show.

DVD release
The DVD is available on the Mondo Macabro DVD label from around 2003. Zinda Laash has been restored so well it's hard to believe the film has languished unseen for over thirty years. The Hot Spot has secured Theatrical and Home Video rights to Zinda Laash for the regions of North America, Europe, Australia and New Zealand as well as Home Video rights for Pakistan. The film is to be part of The Mondo Macabro series of DVD releases due in the near future and will therefore become the first Pakistani film to be released on DVD.

Film festivals
Zinda Laash also has the distinction of being the first ever horror film to be screened at two major film festivals abroad; the Sitges Fantastic Film Festival in Spain and the Neuchatel International Festival of Fantastic Films in Switzerland.

References

External links
 

1967 films
1967 horror films
1960s science fiction horror films
1960s Urdu-language films
Pakistani science fiction horror films
Pakistani black-and-white films
Vampires in film
Urdu-language Pakistani films